Kirsten Sweetland (born September 24, 1988) is a retired Canadian professional triathlete, the Junior World Champion of the year 2006, and the 2010 U23 World Championship silver medalist.

In the six years from 2005 to 2010, Sweetland took part in 26 ITU competitions and achieved 13 top ten positions.
In 2010, Sweetland won the silver medals at the U23 World Championships and at the Premium Pan American Cup in Kelowna.

In France, Sweetland represents the club Tri Olympique Club Cessonnais in the prestigious French Club Championship Series Lyonnaise des Eaux and took part in one of the five triathlons of this circuit. At the Grand Final in La Baule (Triathlon Audencia) on 18 September 2010, she placed 8th and was the best triathlete of her club, which placed 5th thanks to the guest athletes Sweetland and Aileen Morrison.

In 2015, she was member of ECS Triathlon club in Sartrouville in France. In 2016, she was named to the Canadian Olympic team and competed in the Rio Olympics. Kirsten retired from elite triathlon in 2017. Today, she is a triathlon coach, supporting athletes through her online platform,  as well as a Registered Massage Therapist.

ITU Competitions 
The following list is based upon the official ITU rankings and the athlete's ITU Profile Page.
Unless indicated otherwise the following competitions are triathlons and belong to the Elite category. 

DNF = did not finish · DNS = did not start · DSQ = disqualified

Notes

External links
 Triathlon Canada Bio
Kirsten Sweetland Coaching
Sea to Sky Sports Physio

1988 births
Living people
Canadian female triathletes
Commonwealth Games medallists in triathlon
Commonwealth Games silver medallists for Canada
Olympic triathletes of Canada
Sportspeople from Nanaimo
Triathletes at the 2014 Commonwealth Games
Triathletes at the 2016 Summer Olympics
21st-century Canadian women
Medallists at the 2014 Commonwealth Games